Mahmud II (1785–1839) was the 30th Sultan of the Ottoman Empire.

Mahmud II may also refer to:

 Mahmud II (Seljuq sultan) (c. 1105 – 1131), Seljuq sultan of Baghdad
 Mahmud II (mansa) (fl. 1481–1496, ruler of the Mali Empire
 Mahmud II of Johor (1675–1699),Sultan of Johor, Pahang and Lingga
 Mahmud II of Kalat (1864–1931), Khan of the princely state of Kalat

See also
 Mahmud (disambiguation)
 Mahmud I (disambiguation)